Rammstein in Amerika is a live concert video album by German Neue Deutsche Härte band Rammstein. It documents the sold-out show the band played at Madison Square Garden in New York City on 11 December 2010. Most of the footage was recorded at the Bell Centre in Montreal, Canada on 9 December 2010. It also contains two documentaries, regarding the band's history with the United States, and the making of the album Liebe ist für alle da. It was released worldwide on 25 September 2015.

Track listing

Charts

Certifications

References

2015 video albums
Live video albums
Universal Music Group video albums